The 2013–14 season of Division 1, the third tier of ice hockey in Sweden, organized by the Swedish Ice Hockey Association (SIHA), began on 11 September 2013. The regular season concluded on 16 February 2014. The following playoffs towards the qualifier to the second-tier league HockeyAllsvenskan began on 19 February 2014 and ended on 7 March 2014. The qualifiers to Division 1 began on 2 March 2014 and ended on 26 March 2014. The qualifier to HockeyAllsvenskan began on 13 March 2014 and ended on 5 April 2014. The 2013–14 season was the last season the league was named "Division 1"; in April 2014, the league was renamed "Hockeyettan".

Format
The league featured 53 teams (a contraction from the 56 of the 2012–13 season), divided into five geographical groups. This was another change from past seasons, which featured six groups, lettered A through F.  This season, however, groups A and B were merged into Division 1 Norra ("North"). With the exception of Division 1 North, the teams played each team in their initial groups three times, at least once at home and once on the road. In North, the teams played each team four times, twice at home and twice on the road. As with previous years, groups C through F played until the new year, when the top four teams from each group moved into two new groups, Allettan Mellan ("central") and Allettan Södra ("south"), while the remaining teams played a continuation series in the original groups. Division 1 North, however, continued playing in the same group until the conclusion of the regular season. In the continuation groups, the teams received "starting points", dependent on their rankings in their initial groups; the lowest-ranked team received no points, the second-lowest-ranked 2 points, the third-lowest-ranked 4 points, and so on. In the Allettan groups and the 1F continuation group, the teams played each team in their group twice, once at home and once on the road. In the other continuation groups, the teams played each team in their groups three times, at least once at home and once on the road. After the conclusion of the spring series and Division 1 North, the best-ranked teams of Division 1 North, Allettan Central, and Allettan South continued to the playoffs. The four teams that survived the playoffs would continue to the 2014 HockeyAllsvenskan qualifier (Swedish: Kvalserien till HockeyAllsvenskan).  Meanwhile, the teams with the poorest records in North, as well as the continuation groups C through F, would play in the Division 1 qualifiers to retain their spots in Division 1 for the 2014–15 season.

Two teams from Division 1 North, three teams from each of the continuation groups of Division 1 C, D and E, and four teams from the Division 1 F continuation group had to participate in the Division 1 qualifier (Hockeyettan) groups. Only the top team from each of those groups would be guaranteed a Hockeyettan spot in the 2014–15 season, meaning that the league would be cut short by 10 teams and that at least 10 teams would be relegated to Division 2. The SIHA contracted the league down to 47 teams for the 2014–15 season, requiring the SIHA to promote the four second-placed teams in Division 1 qualifiers C–F, the third-placed team from qualifier E, and the third-placed team from qualifier F (the latter two to replace Falu IF, who voluntarily demanded relegation, and bankrupt Nyköpings HK).

Playing format
Each game consisted of three 20-minute regulation periods, for a total of 60 minutes. After the 60 regulation minutes, the team with the most goals scored won the game. If the game was tied after regulation time, a five-minute overtime period ensued, in which the team scoring the next goal won the game. If no team scored during the overtime period, a shootout ensued, with each team taking three penalty shots against the opposing team's goaltender. If the game was still tied after the three penalty shot rounds, additional rounds ensued until one team scored and the other team didn't. Points were awarded for each game, with a win in regulation time giving 3 points, an overtime/shootout win 2 points, an overtime/shootout loss 1 point, and a regulation loss 0 points.

Tiebreak
In case two or more teams ended up tied in points, the following tiebreakers were used:
Better goal difference;
Higher number of goals scored;
Results in games between the tied teams.

Participating teams

r = Relegated from 2012–13 HockeyAllsvenskanp = Promoted from 2012–13 Division 2

Note that Botkyrka HC merged with IFK Tumba Hockey during the off-season.

Initial groups

Division 1 North
Division 1 North was formed out of a merger of Division 1A and 1B.  It consisted of 12 teams, and play continued in this group through the entire regular season.

Division 1C

Division 1C continuation

Division 1D

Division 1D continuation

Division 1E

Division 1E continuation

Division 1F

Division 1F continuation

Allettan Central

Allettan South

Promotion playoffs
The promotion playoffs was divided into three rounds: Playoff 1, Playoff 2, and Playoff 3. The six top-ranked teams from Division 1 North, the four top-ranked teams from each of the Allettan groups, and the top ranked team from each of the continuation groups qualified for the playoffs.  Each playoff match-up was a best-of-three series, with the winners of each playoff round continuing to the next round. In each series the higher-seeded team received home advantage and played an eventual third game at home if necessary to determine a winner of the series. The four teams winning the final round, Playoff 3, continued to the 2014 HockeyAllsvenskan qualifier (Kval till HockeyAllsvenskan) and attempted promotion to the second-tier league HockeyAllsvenskan.

Piteå, Nyköping, and Vita Hästen won the North and Allettan groups, and therefore received byes to the third round.  Sundsvall had the best points average of the second-place North and Allettan teams, and therefore also skipped to the third round.  The two other second-place teams, KRIF and Visby also finished, received byes to the second round.

In Playoff 1, match-ups were determined by the standings in each spring series (including Division 1 North). In Playoff 2 and Playoff 3, match-ups were determined through random draw.

Playoff 1
Kiruna IF, Östersunds IK, Hudiksvalls HC, Huddinge IK, Tingsryds AIF, and Kristianstads IK won their match-ups, and continued to Playoff 2.  They defeated Kalix UHC, Tegs SK, Tierps HK, Wings HC Arlanda, Västerviks IK, and Mariestad BoIS HC respectively.

Kiruna vs Kalix (2–0)

Östersund vs Teg (2–0)

Hudiksvall vs Tierp (2–1)

Huddinge vs Wings (2–1)

Tingsryd vs Västervik (2–1)

Mariestad vs Kristianstad (1–2)

Playoff 2
The six Playoff 1 winners were ranked by their record in their spring series, on the basis of 1) which spring series the teams played in (i.e. Allettan or the continuation series, except Division 1 North), 2) ranking in the standings, 3) points average, 4) goal difference, and 5) goals scored. The two highest-ranked Playoff 1 winners and the two directly-qualified teams faced the four other Playoff 1 winners. The four match-ups were determined through random draw.

Kiruna IF vs Tingsryds AIF (0–2)

Hudiksvalls HC vs Kristianstads IK (0–2)

Visby/Roma HK vs Huddinge IK (2–0)

Kallinge-Ronneby IF vs Östersunds IK (2–0)

Playoff 3
The four directly-qualified teams faced the four Playoff 2 winners. The four match-ups were determined through random draw.  Piteå HC, Tingsryds AIF, HC Vita Hästen, and Kallinge-Ronneby IF both swept their series and proceeded to the 2014 HockeyAllsvenskan qualifier.

Piteå HC vs Kristianstads IK (2–0)

Nyköpings HK vs Tingsryds AIF (0–2)

HC Vita Hästen vs Visby/Roma HK (2–0)

IF Sundsvall Hockey vs Kallinge-Ronneby IF (0–2)

Division 1 qualifiers (Hockeyettan) 
The winners of the five qualifiers were guaranteed spots in the league for the 2014–15 season. In order to get 47 teams in the 2014–15 season, the SIHA also promoted the four second-placed teams from qualifiers C–F. However, two of those 47 teams pulled out of the league during the preseason, resulting in two other teams from the qualifiers being promoted:

 Nyköpings HK, who had qualified for the following Hockeyettan season by reaching Allettan Central and been placed in the West group, went bankrupt on 15 April 2014 and ceased to exist. In response, the SIHA promoted third-placed Varberg Vipers from qualifier F and placed them in the South group; moved HC Dalen from the West group to the South group; and moved Västerviks IK and Vimmerby HC from the South group to the West group.
 Falu IF, who won qualifier C and were seated in the West group, demanded relegation to Division 2 on 13 May 2014 due to financial problems. The SIHA responded by promoting third-placed Grästorps IK from qualifier E to replace Falu's spot in Hockeyettan West.

Qualifier A

Qualifier C

Qualifier D

Qualifier E

Qualifier F

HockeyAllsvenskan qualifier 

The four playoff winners—HC Vita Hästen, Kallinge-Ronneby IF, Piteå HC, and Tingsryds AIF—played the two lowest-ranked teams from HockeyAllsvenskan—IF Björklöven and IF Troja/Ljungby—in a double round-robin tournament, facing each team once at home and once on the road for a total of 10 games per team. HC Vita Hästen managed to promote to HockeyAllsvenskan at the expense of IF Troja/Ljungby, while IF Björklöven defended their HockeyAllsvenskan spot.

References

3
Swedish Division I seasons